Eadbeorht (or Eadberht) was a medieval Bishop of Leicester. He was consecrated in 764. He died between 781 and 785.

Citations

References

External links
 

Bishops of Leicester (ancient)
8th-century English bishops